Grass skippers or banded skippers are butterflies of the subfamily Hesperiinae, part of the skipper family, Hesperiidae. The subfamily was established by Pierre André Latreille in 1809.

Description and distribution
With over 2,000 described species, this is the largest skipper butterfly subfamily and occurs worldwide except in New Zealand. About 50 percent of grass skippers live in the Neotropics. 137 species are native to North America. Around 38 species are native to Australia. Genera Ochlodes and Hesperia exist exclusively in the Holarctic.

They are usually orange, rust, or brown in colour and have pointed forewings. Many species have dark markings or black stigmas on their forewings. Most members of this subfamily have an oval antenna club with an apiculus on the tip, although Carterocephalus and Piruna do not. The antennae generally has a sharp bend.

Hesperiinae larvae feed on many different types of grasses and sedges and palms, though some species are limited. 

Adults typically visit flowers and hold their wings together while feeding. Hesperiinae are unique in that they hold their wings partially open while resting, with the forewings and hindwings held at different angles. This is known as the "jet-plane position". Most male grass skippers perch to await females.

Adults are strong fliers; they move quickly and usually in a linear direction. Some of the species, however, do flutter and these species patrol for females rather than perch.

Conservation 
The following grass skippers are considered at risk.

References

External links

 Markku Savela's Lepidoptera and some other life forms: Preliminary species list. Version of 6 April 2007. Retrieved 28 May 2007.
Reference photographs: Skippers of North America   Cirrus Digital Imaging
TOL
RMCA Images of types.
Flickr

Hesperiinae